Provincial minister may refer to:

 A member of the Executive Council for one of the provinces of Canada
 A minister in one of the provincial governments of Pakistan
 Provincial minister (Sri Lanka)

See Also
 Provincial superior, a major superior of a religious order